At Their Very Best is an album released by British pop group The Shadows released on 4 December 1989. The tracks were recorded in 1989.

Musicians
Hank Marvin - Lead Guitar
Bruce Welch - Rhythm Guitar
Brian Bennett - Drums & Percussion
Cliff Hall - Keyboards
Mark Griffiths - Bass guitar
Venue - Honeyhill Studios, Radlett.
Dick Plant - Engineer

Track listing (LP/TC)
Side one
"Apache"
"Man Of Mystery" (from The Edgar Wallace Mysteries)
"Shindig"
"Wonderful Land"
"The Rise And Fall Of Flingel Bunt"
"Theme From The Deer Hunter (Cavatina)"
"The Boys" (from The Boys)
"The Frightened City" (from The Frightened City)
"Theme For Young Lovers" (from Wonderful Life)
"Dance On"
Side two
"The Savage" (from The Young Ones)
"F.B.I."
"Guitar Tango"
"Genie With The Light Brown Lamp"
"Atlantis"
"Foot Tapper" (from Summer Holiday)
"Don't Cry For Me Argentina" (from Evita)
"Kon-Tiki"
"Geronimo"
"The Stranger"

References

The Shadows albums
1989 compilation albums
PolyGram albums